Matthew Charles McDermott (born November 22, 1977) is an associate justice of the Iowa Supreme Court.

Education 
McDermott grew up in Carroll, Iowa and received a Bachelor of Arts with distinction and honors in economics and political science from the University of Iowa in 2000. He then attended the UC Berkeley School of Law, receiving a Juris Doctor in 2003. At Berkeley, he was executive editor of the California Law Review and taught in the political science department.

Legal career 
While in law school, McDermott worked as a summer associate at Cravath, Swaine & Moore in New York City. He also volunteered at the East Bay Community Law Center.

McDermott turned down an offer at Cravath and instead worked at the Des Moines law firm Belin McCormick P.C., where he was a partner specializing in civil litigation and criminal defense as well as, for a time, firm president. His clients included the State of Iowa, the Republican Party of Iowa, and Kim Reynolds. He was recognized by Chambers and Partners for his commercial litigation practice from 2012 to 2020 and won "Lawyer of the Year" awards for litigation in 2015 and 2020 from The Best Lawyers in America. At the firm, he worked with two other future justices of the Iowa Supreme Court, Edward Mansfield and Christopher McDonald, as well as with future federal judge Stephen H. Locher.

In addition to his private practice, McDermott was the president and a member of the board of directors of Iowa Legal Aid. He served as Iowa counsel to the John McCain 2008 presidential campaign and as a local chair for the Tim Pawlenty 2012 presidential campaign and the Jeb Bush 2016 presidential campaign.

Appointment to the Iowa Supreme Court 
In April 2020, McDermott was appointed by Governor Kim Reynolds to the Iowa Supreme Court to fill the seat vacated by David Wiggins. McDermott was previously an unsuccessful finalist for the seat on the Iowa Supreme Court that went to Dana Oxley and for United States Attorney for the Southern District of Iowa.

References 

1977 births
Living people
20th-century American lawyers
21st-century American judges
21st-century American lawyers
Iowa lawyers
Justices of the Iowa Supreme Court
UC Berkeley School of Law alumni
University of Iowa alumni